Ceratophallus kisumiensis is a species of freshwater air-breathing snails, aquatic pulmonate gastropod mollusks in the family Planorbidae, the ram's horn snails, or planorbids. All species in this genus have sinistral or left-coiling shells.

This species is found in Kenya, Tanzania, and Uganda. Its natural habitats are freshwater lakes and intermittent freshwater lakes.

References

Planorbidae
Gastropods described in 1912
Taxonomy articles created by Polbot